Malinao, officially the Municipality of Malinao, is a 3rd class municipality in the province of Albay, Philippines. According to the 2020 census, it has a population of 47,395 people.

History

Malinao was founded in 1600, or 79 years after Ferdinand Magellan landed in Cebu and planted the first Christian Cross.

Between 1600 and 1616, Malinao was then part of the Diocese of Cagsawa (now Daraga). It became an independent bisita or sitio attached to Sawangan (now Legazpi City) until 1619, when separate religious administration was exercised with Rev. Francisco de Santa Ana, OFM, as first pastor.

Local folklore speaks of a plant once rich in this town called "alinao." The prefix "ma", which denotes abundance of something in local dialect, was affixed by the natives in referring to the place abundant with Alinao, thus Ma-alinao and later corrupted to Malinao.

It was in 1916 when, according to legendary account, Malinao got its name. A siege by Moros on the town resulted in the abduction of seven women. Miraculously, the boat sank within the jurisdictional waters of Malinao and on that same spot in the sea across the island of natunawan because of the women's fervent prayer in canticles and "tarahades" or clear thoughts for the Blessed Virgin to sink the boat. From these "clear thoughts" of the seven women translated in Bicol dialect as "malinao na isip".

The name of Malinao was given to the Municipality. It has since then the tradition among the residents particularly the women, to sing the canticles or tarahades in times of crisis, calamities, or when they want to drive away epidemics and misfortunes.

Geography
According to the Philippine Statistics Authority, the municipality has a land area of  constituting  of the  total area of Albay.

Malinao occupies a narrow stretch of plains hemmed in by Lagonoy Gulf in the east and Mount Malinao on the west.

Land use

 Public land: 
 Built-up/Residential: 
 Agricultural: 
 Irrigable: 
 Irrigated: 
 Forest: 
 Timberland: 
 2nd growth: 
 Watershed: 
 Mangrove/swamp: 
 Grassland/Shrub/Pasture: 
 Idle/Vacant lot: 
 Nipas:

Barangays
Malinao is politically subdivided into 29 barangays. Of these, 12 are upland barangays, 13 lowland barangays, and 4 are coastal barangays. Twenty-five barangays are rural areas and the remaining four are urban.

Climate

Demographics

In the 2020 census, Malinao had a population of 47,395.

In 1995, The total population was 33,872, which increased by 2359 individuals or 6.94% for five (5) years in 2000. In the 2010 census, the population had reached 42,770.

Of these, less than ten (10) percent or 3,301 reside in the urban barangays of Bagumbayan, Pawa, Payahan, and Poblacion. The rest of the constituents meanwhile stay on the rural barangays: Awang, Bagatangki, Balading, Balza, Bariw, Baybay, Bulang, Burabod, Cabunturan, Comun, Diaro, Estancia, Jonop, Labnig, Libod, Malolos, matalipni, Ogob, Quinarabasahan, Santa Elena, Soa, Sugcad, Tagoytoy, Tanawan, and Tuliw. The densest areas are Estancia, Labnig, and Balading while Awang and Bagatangki are the least populated in the rural areas.

The majority of its population is engaged in agriculture and other agri-related enterprise.

Economy

The major agricultural products are:
 Palay
 Irrigated:  - 11,754.00 MT
 Rainfed:  - 1,992.90 MT
 Abaca:  - 252.00 MT
 Coconut:  - 54.87 MT

Other crops:
 Camote:  - 48.50 MT
 Cassava:  - 45.50 MT
 Gabi:  - 4.50 MT
 Vegetable (leafy):  - 9.049 MT
 Fruit vegetable:  - 93.95 MT
 Fruits:  - 229.4 MT
 Sugarcane:  - 0.84 MT

References

External links

 [ Philippine Standard Geographic Code]

Municipalities of Albay